Nat'l R.R. Passenger Corp. v. Boston & Me. Corp., 503 U.S. 407 (1992), was a case in which the Supreme Court of the United States ruled that the National Railroad Passenger Corporation (better known as Amtrak), could condemn railroad property from Boston and Maine Railroad and convey it to another railroad in order to continue passenger rail service over that route.

History

The Montrealer was originally a service of the Boston and Maine Railroad which used B&M's Connecticut River Line south of Vernon, Vermont to reach New York City. The NYC-Montréal portion of this route was continued under Amtrak.

The Montrealer was suspended from early April 1987 to mid-July 1989 because of deteriorating track conditions on the Boston and Maine Railroad, which had been taken over by Guilford Transportation.  During the suspension, Amtrak offered "Ambus" service (operated by Vermont Transit).

To restore passenger rail service, Amtrak seized the section of the line between Windsor and Brattleboro by eminent domain. The track was rebuilt using federal funds and sold to the Central Vermont Railway. The train was reinstated in July 1989, continuing until 1995 on a modified route which used the Central Vermont Railway (now the New England Central Railroad) from East Northfield to New London, Connecticut.

The Supreme Court upheld Amtrak's action.

References

External links

1992 in United States case law
United States Supreme Court cases
United States Supreme Court cases of the Rehnquist Court
Amtrak
Boston and Maine Railroad
Eminent domain
Railway litigation in 1992